The Musée des Confluences is a science centre and anthropology museum which opened on 20 December 2014 in the 2nd arrondissement of Lyon, (Rhône), France. It is located at the southern tip of the Presqu'île at the confluence of the Rhône and the Saône, adjacent to Autoroute A7, and comprises part of a larger redevelopment project of the Confluence quarter of Lyon. The deconstructivist architectural design, said to resemble a floating crystal cloud of stainless steel and glass, was created by the Austrian firm Coop Himmelb(l)au.

History

The museum includes collections of natural science, anthropology, and Earth Sciences of the Musée d'histoire naturelle - Guimet. These collections will be supplemented by exhibitions of arts and crafts.

The four major exhibitions are called "Origins - Stories of the World", "Species - the Web of life", "Societies - Human theatre," and "Eternities - Visions of the beyond". The first exhibition deals with questions of origin, both the Big Bang theory, history of the universe, as well as the birth of life and evolution of especially humans. The second exhibition, "Species", explores the links between humans and animals, and evolution of different species. The third exhibition, "societies" is about human societies and how humans build communities. And finally, "Eternities" deals with the meaning of life, the inevitable death of humans, and how that question has been dealt with in different societies.

The museum stands 44 m (144 ft) high, 150 m (492 ft) long, and 83 m (272 ft) wide. Total area will be 22,000 m2 (238,000 sq ft), 6,500 of which will be devoted to exhibitions, three times greater than the museum exhibition space. Nine concurrent exhibitions (4 permanent + 5 temporary), plus four discovery spaces and two auditoriums will be available. Construction cost was budgeted for €153 million, but the controversial final cost is now forecast to approach nearly €300 million

See also 
 List of museums in France

References

External links 

 Official site of the museum
 Musée des Confluences on Mapolis
 Musée des Confluence, on the site of Lyon

2nd arrondissement of Lyon
Culture in Lyon
Museums in Lyon
Deconstructivism
Coop Himmelblau
Anthropology museums in France
Natural history museums in France